Central Committee of the National Society for Women's Suffrage was a committee formed in 1872 in London to lobby parliament. It was initially led by activists from Manchester.

History 
Jacob Bright suggested in 1871 that it would be useful to create a London-based organisation to lobby members of parliament concerning women's suffrage. The Central Committee of the National Society for Women's Suffrage first met on 17 January 1872. The first committee included Frances Power Cobbe, Priscilla Bright McLaren, Lilias Ashworth Hallett and Agnes Garrett. The committee introduced a subscription fee of a shilling per annum. Millicent Fawcett joined the committee in 1874.

In the year 1900 the two organizations Central and Western Society for Women's Suffrage and the Central and East of England Society for Women's Suffrage merged and formed Central Society for Women's Suffrage.

Lydia Becker became the chair of the committee in 1881. Other committee members then included Helen Blackburn, Millicent Fawcett, Jessie Boucherett, Eva McLaren, Margaret Bright Lucas as well as Priscilla Bright McLaren and Frances Power Cobbe.

References 

Women's suffrage in the United Kingdom
Feminist organisations in the United Kingdom
Feminism and history
Women's organisations based in the United Kingdom
1872 establishments in the United Kingdom
Suffrage organisations in the United Kingdom
Organizations established in 1872
First-wave feminism
National Society for Women's Suffrage